Theatonius is an extinct genus of Cretaceous amphibians known from North America. Originally described from the Lance Formation, Wyoming, it is now also known from Utah, Montana, and New Jersey.

See also
 Prehistoric amphibian
 List of prehistoric amphibians

References

Cretaceous amphibians of North America
Fossil taxa described in 1976
Taxa named by Richard C. Fox